Jupar (also Romanized as Jūpār) is a city in Mahan District, Kerman County, Kerman Province, Iran.  At the 2006 census, its population was 3,830, in 1,054 families.

References

Populated places in Kerman County

Cities in Kerman Province